The 1912 United States presidential election in Indiana took place on November 5, 1912, as part of the 1912 United States presidential election. State voters chose 15 representatives, or electors, to the Electoral College, who voted for president and vice president.

Indiana was won by Princeton University President Woodrow Wilson (D–New Jersey), running with Indiana Governor Thomas R. Marshall, with 43.07% of the popular vote, against the 26th president of the United States Theodore Roosevelt (P–New York), running with governor of California Hiram Johnson, with 24.75% of the popular vote, the 27th president of the United States William Howard Taft (R–Ohio), running with Columbia University President Nicholas Murray Butler, with 23.11% of the popular vote and the five-time candidate of the Socialist Party of America for President of the United States Eugene V. Debs (S–Indiana), running with the first Socialist mayor of a major city in the United States Emil Seidel, with 5.64% of the popular vote.

, this is the last election in which Hamilton County or Hendricks County voted for the Democratic candidate.

Results

County Returns

See also
 United States presidential elections in Indiana

References

Indiana
1912
1912 Indiana elections